WZNA-LD (channel 3), branded on-air as Nueva Vida TV, is a Spanish religious television station licensed to Guaynabo, Puerto Rico. the station is owned by New Life Broadcasting; the owners of radio stations WNVM 97.7 FM, WDNO 960 AM & WNVE 98.7 FM. The licensee is managed by Juan Carlos Matos Barreto, who serves as President & General manager of the station. The station's transmitter is located at Cerro La Marquesa in Aguas Buenas. WZNA-LD is part of the Nueva Vida Christian Television network. The station's programming consists of Christian music videos.

Digital television

Digital channel

About Nueva Vida TV

OptimaVision starts as a video-streaming service. On November 14, 2013, OptimaVision launched WNTE-LD channel 36 in Mayaguez, now owned by Make TV Corporation, as a satellite of WVDO-LD. WZNA-LD (as WVTE-LD) followed on March 24, 2014. WQHA, channel 50 (formerly a repeater for WUJA channel 58), was sold for $29 million to Western New Life, Inc. on May 2, 2014, and became the third channel in the network. NCN Television moved its programming to WQHA-DT2. On January 1, 2018, OptimaVision rebrands itself as Zona TV. On August 1, the station is once again rebranded as Nueva Vida TV.

References

External links

Television channels and stations established in 2014
2014 establishments in Puerto Rico
Low-power television stations in the United States
Christian television stations in Puerto Rico
Guaynabo, Puerto Rico